Foc is a Barcelona Metro station located in the Zona Franca neighborhood of the Barcelona municipality, served by line L10.

The station is located underneath the Passeig de la Zona Franca.

The station opened on 8 September 2018, when line L10 opened from Collblanc station to this station, as a terminal, until February 2020 and the opening of Zona Franca station.

References

External links

Barcelona Metro line 10 stations
Railway stations in Spain opened in 2018
2018 establishments in Catalonia